The Belize national women's cricket team is the team that represents Belize in international women's cricket. In April 2018, the International Cricket Council (ICC) granted full Women's Twenty20 International (WT20I) status to all its members. Therefore, all Twenty20 matches played between Belize women and other ICC members after 1 July 2018 will be a full WT20I.

The team played its first WT20I matches during a tour of Costa Rica in December 2019.

Records and statistics
International Match Summary — Belize Women
 
Last updated 15 December 2019

Twenty20 International
T20I record versus other nations

Records complete to WT20I #816. Last updated 15 December 2019.

See also
 List of Belize women Twenty20 International cricketers
 Belize national cricket team

References

Women's
Women's national cricket teams
Cricket